Denisa Proto (born 25 April 1991) is an Albanian football defender who plays for KF Vllaznia Shkodër as well as the Albania national team.

See also
List of Albania women's international footballers

External links 
 

1997 births
Living people
Albanian women's footballers
Women's association football defenders
KFF Vllaznia Shkodër players
Albania women's international footballers